Suicide by cop or suicide by police is a suicide method in which a suicidal individual deliberately behaves in a threatening manner, with intent to provoke a lethal response from a public safety or law enforcement officer to end their own life.

Overview 
There are two broad categories of "suicide by cop".  The first is when someone has committed a crime and is being pursued by the police and decides that they would rather commit suicide than be arrested.  These people may not otherwise be suicidal but may simply decide that life is not worth living if they are incarcerated and thus will provoke police to kill them.  The second version involves people who are already contemplating suicide and who decide that provoking law enforcement into killing them is the best way to act on their desires.  These individuals may commit a crime with the specific intention of provoking a law enforcement response.

The idea of committing suicide in this manner is based on trained procedures of law enforcement officers, specifically the policy on the use of deadly force. In jurisdictions where officials are readily capable of deadly force, often by being equipped with firearms, there are usually set circumstances where they will predictably use deadly force against a threat to themselves or others. This form of suicide functions by exploiting this trained reaction. The most common scenario is pointing a firearm at a police officer or an innocent person, which would be expected to provoke an officer to fire on them. Many variants exist; for example, attacking with a knife or other hand weapon, trying to run an officer or other person over with a car, or trying to trigger a real or presumed explosive device.

This concept hinges on the person's state of mind, and their desire to end their own life, which can be difficult to determine post mortem. Some cases are obvious, such as pointing an unloaded or non-functioning gun, such as a toy gun, air gun, airsoft gun, or starter's pistol, at officers, or the presence of a suicide note. Some suspects brazenly announce their intention to die before they act; however, many cases can be more difficult to determine, as some suspects with the desire to die will actually fire live ammunition and even kill people before being killed themselves. Many law enforcement training programs have added sections to specifically address handling these situations if officers suspect that the subject is attempting to goad them into using lethal force.

History 
Many modern cases that pre-date the formal recognition of the phenomenon have been identified or speculated by historians as matching the pattern now known as suicide by cop.  According to authors Mark Lindsay and David Lester, Houston McCoy, one of the two Austin Police Department officers who shot and killed Charles Whitman, the "Texas Tower Sniper", believed that Whitman could have shot him and fellow officer Ramiro Martinez, but "he was waiting for them, and wanted to be shot."  The 1976 death of Mal Evans, road manager, assistant, and a friend of the Beatles, who aimed an air gun at police and refused to put it down, was theorized as a possible example of this phenomenon. Some historians believe that Giuseppe Zangara, the man who killed Chicago mayor Anton Cermak in a possible attempt to assassinate then President-elect Franklin D. Roosevelt, might have been attempting suicide by police. In 2018, Alek Minassian, the perpetrator of the Toronto van attack, claimed to have attempted suicide by cop when apprehended by police after his attack, requesting to be killed and claiming he was armed with a gun, a declaration which was false.

Recognition and research

The phenomenon has been described in news accounts from 1981, and scientific journals since 1985.  The phrase has appeared in news headlines since at least 1987. It did not become common until the early 2000s. The phrase seems to have originated in the United States, but has also appeared in the UK, where a jury first determined someone committed suicide by cop in 2003.

Some of the first research into suicide by cop was completed by Sgt. Rick Parent of the Delta Police Department.  Parent's research of 843 police shootings determined that about 50% were victim precipitated homicide.  Police defined victim precipitated homicide as "an incident in which an individual bent on self-destruction, engages in life threatening and criminal behavior to force law enforcement officers to kill them."

The first formally labeled "Suicide by Cop" case in English legal history was a judgment made on May 9th, 2003 by the Reverend Dr. William Dolman while serving as a London coroner between 1993 and 2007. It set a legal precedent and the judgment, as a cause of death, has been a part of English law since.

A 2009 study in the United States of the profiles of 268 people who committed suicide by cop found that
 95% were male and 5% were female
 the mean age was 35 for men
 41% of men were Caucasian, 26% Hispanic and 16% African American
 37% of men were single
 29% of men had children
 54% of men were unemployed
 29% of men did not have housing
 62% of men had confirmed or probable histories of mental health issues
 80% of men were armed – of these, 60% possessed firearms (of which 86% were loaded) and 26% possessed knives
 19% feigned or simulated weapon possession
 87% of individuals made suicidal communications prior to and/or during the incident
 36% were under the influence of alcohol.

Examples 

 In the Aramoana massacre, a spree shooting that occurred on 13 November 1990 in New Zealand, police shot the suspect dead as he came out of a house firing from the hip and screaming "Kill me!"
 In December 2008, 15-year-old Tyler Cassidy was shot and killed by three Victoria Police officers after he threatened them with two large knives and ordered them to shoot him.
 Myron May, a 31-year-old man believing he was a victim of government covert electronic harassment on the line of Cold War era MKUltra and COINTELPRO clandestine US government programs, committed suicide by cop on 20 November 2014 after recording his intentions on tape.
 On 4 January 2015, a 32-year-old San Francisco man, Matthew Hoffman, staged a standoff with police in the parking lot of an SFPD station. When he brandished the gun, two officers shot him a total of three times. He left a message for the officers on his cell phone, saying: "You did nothing wrong. You ended the life of a man who was too much of a coward to do it himself ... I provoked you. I threatened your life as well as the lives of those around me."
 In June 2015, 21-year-old Trepierre Hummons, a known gangster with a history of weapons violations, posted his intent to commit suicide by cop on Facebook on the same day that a sex offense had been reported against him. He called 9-1-1 and reported he had seen a man acting erratically with a gun. He then shot the responding officer multiple times, mortally wounding him. The next officer to arrive on the scene shot Hummons. Both Hummons and the wounded policeman later died in the hospital.
 Anton Lundin Pettersson, the perpetrator of the October 2015 Trollhättan school attack in Sweden, wrote a message to an online friend an hour before the attack, where he says that he expected to be dead within one or two hours, that he hated himself, and hoped that "those fucking cops aim straight, because I really don't want to survive the commotion." Pettersson had a history of mental illness, and a book about the attack with interviews of many people around him states that "during the period before the attack, he wavered between several options; to seek professional help, to kill himself 'normally' or to attack people around him to get killed."
 On 28 May 2017, a man in Mississippi suspected of murdering seven of his family members and a police officer told a journalist that by shooting towards police, "Suicide by cop was my intention. I ain't fit to live. Not after what I've done."

In literary fiction 
In To Kill a Mockingbird, Tom Robinson, a despondent black man who is imprisoned for a rape he did not commit, is shot 17 times and killed while trying to escape from prison in front of the prison guards.

See also 
 Banzai charge
 Circumcellions
 Consensual homicide
 Lists of killings by law enforcement officers
 Police brutality
 Running amok
 Samaritans (charity)
 Suicide crisis
 Suicide intervention
 Suicide prevention

References

Further reading

External links
 Results of one study of the phenomenon
 Law enforcement suicide prevention resources 
 FBI Law Enforcement Bulletin: February, 2005; Volume 74; Number 2 
 An information portal with support resources for Law Enforcement officers

Suicide methods